Île Anselme-Fay is an island in Shawinigan, Canada.  The island is surrounded by the Saint-Maurice River.

See also
List of Quebec rivers
Saint-Maurice River

References

River islands of Quebec
Landforms of Mauricie